William Bushby (25 January 1864 – 14 April 1936) was an Australian rules footballer for , , and briefly for .

Playing career
Bushby was a big-bodied attacking centreman, adept at playing through the half-forwards with his size. Bushby was a member of their 1884 and 1890 SAFA premiership-winning teams, and was captain of the club from 1886 to 1889.

In 1886, Bushby left Adelaide shortly before the end of the 1886 SAFA season, and travelled to Melbourne to play for the South Melbourne Football Club for its last five matches of the 1886 VFA season – and, in particular, to play in the 4 September match against undefeated , a match near certain to have decided the VFA premiership for the season. It is thought to be the first case of a crack South Australian player being recruited by a Victorian club, and was controversial. Although Bushby played some good matches for South Melbourne, he played so poorly in the 4 September match that his failures were still recounted decades later in Victoria: he won few if any possessions, and his direct opponent, Geelong captain David Hickinbotham, was the best player on the ground in Geelong's dominant four goals to one victory. It was not Bushby's only connection to Victorian football, the Fitzroy Football Club accused of making him a big money offer to transfer in 1892.

References

1864 births
1936 deaths
Australian rules footballers from South Australia
Port Adelaide Football Club (SANFL) players
Port Adelaide Football Club players (all competitions)
South Adelaide Football Club players
South Melbourne Football Club (VFA) players